Licinius Nepos is a personage who lived during the reign of the emperor Trajan. Pliny the Younger, a Roman writer, mentions Licinius Nepos in his letters. Pliny describes him as a praetor, who is so brave and strong that he is unafraid to punish even senators. Ronald Syme has proposed identifying him with the suffect consul of 127, M. Licinius Celer Nepos.

Notes

External links 
 Bust of L. Licinius Nepos The Getty Center Museum of Art 

2nd-century Romans
Ancient Roman governors